Barry Lillywhite (born 4 May 1946) is a British modern pentathlete. He competed at the 1968 and 1972 Summer Olympics.

References

External links
 

1946 births
Living people
Sportspeople from Brighton
British male modern pentathletes
Olympic modern pentathletes of Great Britain
Modern pentathletes at the 1968 Summer Olympics
Modern pentathletes at the 1972 Summer Olympics